Bivolari is a commune in Iași County, Western Moldavia, Romania. It is composed of five villages: Bivolari, Buruienești, Soloneț, Tabăra and Traian.

Natives
Vlad Neculau
Alexandru Tzaicu

References

Communes in Iași County
Localities in Western Moldavia
Populated places on the Prut